The 1957–58 New York Knicks season was the 12th season for the team in the National Basketball Association (NBA). With a 35–37 regular season record, the Knicks did not qualify for the 1958 NBA Playoffs.

NBA Draft

Note: This is not an extensive list; it only covers the first and second rounds, and any other players picked by the franchise that played at least one game in the league.

Regular season

Season standings

x – clinched playoff spot

Record vs. opponents

Game log

References

External links
1957–58 New York Knickerbockers Statistics

New York Knicks seasons
New York
New York Knicks
New York Knicks
1950s in Manhattan
Madison Square Garden